This is a list of Belgian television related events from 2013.

Events
11 January - Figure skater Kevin van der Perren and his partner Charissa van Dipte win the fifth and final season of Sterren op de Dansvloer.
3 May - Paulien Mathues wins the second season of The Voice van Vlaanderen.
21 December - 34-year-old singer Michael Lanzo wins the second season of Belgium's Got Talent.

Debuts

Television shows

1990s
Samson en Gert (1990–present)
Familie (1991–present)
Thuis (1995–present)

2000s
Mega Mindy (2006–present)

2010s
ROX (2011–present)
The Voice van Vlaanderen (2011–present)
Belgium's Got Talent (2012–present)
Let's Get Fit (2013)

Ending this year
Sterren op de Dansvloer (2006–2013)

Births

Deaths

See also
2013 in Belgium